The Supercopa do Brasil Sub-17, is an official Brazilian national football super cup tournament for U-17 teams, reuniting the champions of Campeonato Brasileiro Sub-17 and Copa do Brasil Sub-17 of the season.

List of champions

Following there are all the Supercup U-17 editions:

Titles by club

See also
 Supercopa do Brasil Sub-20

References

Youth football competitions in Brazil
5
Under-17 association football
Sports leagues established in 2019